Matej Tonin (born 30 June 1983) is a Slovenian politician.

Tonin graduated from political sciences at the University of Ljubljana in 2007. A member of the New Slovenia (NSi) party, he was seen as one of the key people that helped the party win seats in the 2011 parliamentary election, having been absent in the 2008–2011 assembly. Tonin was also elected an MP in the 2014 and 2018 election.

In January 2018, Ljudmila Novak announced her resignation as the president of NSi and Tonin took over the party.

On 22 June 2018 Tonin was elected 13th Speaker of the National Assembly. Following the formation of the coalition around Marjan Šarec, Tonin stepped down on 23 August 2018 to be replaced by Dejan Židan of Social Democrats.

On 13 March 2020, Tonin became the Minister of Defence in the 14th Government of Slovenia.

References

1983 births
Living people
Presidents of the National Assembly (Slovenia)
Members of the National Assembly (Slovenia)
University of Ljubljana alumni
New Slovenia politicians
Deputy Prime Ministers of Slovenia
Defence ministers of Slovenia